Turnera chamaedrifolia is a species of Turnera in Bahia and Mina Gerias, Brazil.

References

External links
 
 

chamaedrifolia
Flora of Brazil